The 2013 Fed Cup (also known as the 2013 Fed Cup by BNP Paribas for sponsorship purposes) was the 51st edition of the most important tournament between national teams in women's tennis.

The draw took place on 6 June 2012 in Paris, France.

The final took place at the Tennis Club Cagliari in Cagliari, Italy on 1–2 November. The home and three time champions Italy defeated the fourth-seeded Russia, to win their fourth title.

World Group

Participating teams

Draw

World Group II

The World Group II was the second highest level of Fed Cup competition in 2013. Winners advanced to the World Group play-offs, and the losers played in the World Group II play-offs.

Date: 9–10 February

World Group play-offs 

The four losing teams in the World Group first round ties, and four winners of the World Group II ties entered the draw for the World Group play-offs. Four seeded teams, based on the latest Fed Cup ranking, were drawn against four unseeded teams.

Date: 20–21 April

World Group II play-offs

The four losing teams from World Group II played off against qualifiers from Zonal Group I. Two teams qualified from Europe/Africa Zone, one team from the Asia/Oceania Zone, and one team from the Americas Zone.

Date: 20–21 April

Americas Zone 

 Nations in bold advanced to the higher level of competition.
 Nations in italics were relegated down to a lower level of competition.

Group I 
Venue: Country Club de Ejecutivos, Medellín, Colombia (outdoor clay)

Dates: 6–9 February

Participating teams

Group II 
Venue: Maya Country Club, Santa Tecla, El Salvador

Dates: 17–20 July

Participating teams

Asia/Oceania Zone 

 Nations in bold advanced to the higher level of competition.
 Nations in italics were relegated down to a lower level of competition.

Group I 
Venue: National Tennis Centre, Astana, Kazakhstan (indoor hard)

Dates: 6–9 February

Participating teams

Group II 
Venue: National Tennis Centre, Astana, Kazakhstan (indoor hard)

Dates: 4–9 February

Participating teams

Europe/Africa Zone 

 Nations in bold advanced to the higher level of competition.
 Nations in italics were relegated down to a lower level of competition.

Group I 
Venue: Municipal Tennis Club, Eilat, Israel (outdoor hard)

Dates: 6–10 February

Participating teams

Pools

Play-offs

  and  advanced to World Group II play-offs.

Group II 
Venue: Bellevue Club, Ulcinj, Montenegro (outdoor clay)

Dates: 17–20 April

Participating teams

Group III 
Venue: Terraten Club, Chișinău, Moldova (outdoor clay)

Dates: 8–11 May

Participating teams

Rankings
The rankings were measured after the three points during the year that play took place, and were collated by combining points earned from the previous four years.

See also
 2013 Davis Cup

References

External links 
 2013 Fed Cup

 
Fed Cup
Billie Jean King Cups by year
2013 in women's tennis